The 1968 Atlantic Coast Conference men's basketball tournament was held in Charlotte, North Carolina, at the original Charlotte Coliseum from March 7–9, 1968. North Carolina defeated NC State, 87–50, to win the championship. Larry Miller of North Carolina was named tournament MVP. NC State's 12–10 victory over Duke in the semifinals was the lowest-scoring game in ACC Tournament history. This was the first ACC Tournament held in Charlotte.

Bracket

References

Tournament
ACC men's basketball tournament
Basketball competitions in Charlotte, North Carolina
College sports in North Carolina
ACC men's basketball tournament